The  Board of Marshals (원수부,元帥府) was the ministry which managed over all the military of the Korean Empire. This was for centralizing power towards the then-emperor, Gojong of the Korean Empire. Gojong established it to have the supreme command of the army. After the establishment of the board, the power of the military authorities was handed to the Emperor. Two regiments' of both the Imperial Guards and the City Guards were organized to guard the capital city, Hanyang (한성,漢城). The Board then commissioned Military Police, Military Engineers, and a Military Band. The total number of the modernized army grew to a significant number of 28,000 just before the Russo-Japanese War. After the Japanese won, the Japanese disbanded the ministry to reduce and later remove all military power from the Emperor.

Organization 
The Board of Marshals was consists of four organizations. Followings are the organizations and their roles:

 Military Affairs Section: Responsible for preparing battles
 Prosecuting Section: Responsible for punishing the personnels
 Recording Section: Responsible for recording
 Accounting Section: Responsible for managing budget

References

The Military History of Korea. Seoul: HQ of the Army of R.O.Korea, 1977. Print.

 Military history of Korea
 Korean Empire